Swarna Medal may refer to:

Swarna Medal, Malayalam film released in 1977 
Swarna Medal, Malayalam film released in 2004